Horní Poříčí is a municipality and village in Strakonice District in the South Bohemian Region of the Czech Republic. It has about 300 inhabitants.

Administrative parts
The village of Dolní Poříčí is an administrative part of Horní Poříčí.

Gallery

References

Villages in Strakonice District